Amy Wilson may refer to:
 Amy Wilson (artist) (born 1973), American artist
 Amy Wilson (soccer) (born 1980), Australian football player
 Amy Wilson-Hardy (born 1991), English rugby player